Marinci may refer to:

 Marinci (supporter group), organized football supporters from Subotica, Serbia
 Marinci, Vukovar-Syrmia County, a village in the Nuštar municipality, Croatia
 Marinci, Istria County, a village in the Buzet municipality, Croatia